The 2020 Icelandic Super Cup was the 49th final in the Icelandic Super Cup, an annual game between the League champions and the Cup champions. The match was played at KR-völlur in Reykjavík on 7 June.

Match details

References 

Football competitions in Iceland
Super Cup